The 1982–83 Major Indoor Soccer League season was the fifth in league history and would end with the San Diego Sockers winning their first MISL title. It would be the Sockers' second straight indoor championship, as the club had won the North American Soccer League's indoor league the previous spring.

Recap
The league would enter into an agreement with the NASL in the summer of 1982 to begin plans for an eventual merger. Initial plans to have all 14 NASL teams play in the winter would not come to pass, as most teams preferred to concentrate on the outdoor season. However, the Chicago Sting and Golden Bay Earthquakes would join the Sockers for the MISL season.

The Earthquakes would perform worst of the three NASL teams, but picked up Steve Zungul from the New York Arrows when New York's new management decided to try to 'Americanize' the team in an attempt to boost ticket sales. The Arrows, only two games out of first place when the trade was made on January 19, finished at .500 and were eliminated in the first round of the playoffs. Despite the Quakes' struggles, Zungul would win the MISL scoring title again.

The expansion Los Angeles Lazers, owned by the Los Angeles Lakers' Jerry Buss, set a record for the lowest winning percentage in league history. After the season, Chicago, San Diego and Golden Bay withdrew and returned to the NASL as the league made plans for an indoor return the following winter. Despite losing the NASL teams, the league continued to expand as teams were announced for Tacoma in 1983-84 and Dallas for 1984-85.

The MISL continued to make inroads on national television. While the spring would see the end of the league's two-year deal with the USA Network, CBS would broadcast a playoff game live from Cleveland on May 7 that drew an estimated four million viewers.

Teams

Regular Season Schedule

The 1982–83 regular season schedule ran from November 5, 1982, to April 17, 1983. The 48 games per team was an increase of four over the 1981–82 schedule of 44 games.

Final standings

Playoff teams in bold.

Playoffs

Quarterfinals

Semifinals

Championship Series

Regular Season Player Statistics

Scoring leaders

GP = Games Played, G = Goals, A = Assists, Pts = Points

Leading goalkeepers

Note: GP = Games played; Min = Minutes played; GA = Goals against; GAA = Goals against average; W = Wins; L = Losses

Playoff Player Statistics

Scoring leaders

GP = Games Played, G = Goals, A = Assists, Pts = Points

Leading goalkeepers

Note: GP = Games played; Min = Minutes played; GA = Goals against; GAA = Goals against average; W = Wins; L = Losses

All-MISL Teams

League awards
Most Valuable Player: Alan Mayer, San Diego

Scoring Champion: Steve Zungul, New York/Golden Bay

Pass Master: Stan Stamenkovic, Baltimore

Defender of the Year: Bernie James, Cleveland

Rookie of the Year: Kirk Shermer, Los Angeles

Goalkeeper of the Year: Zoltán Tóth, New York

Coach of the Year: Pat McBride, Kansas City

Championship Series Most Valuable Player: Juli Veee, San Diego

References

External links
 The Year in American Soccer - 1983
 1982-83 summary at The MISL: A Look Back

Major Indoor Soccer League (1978–1992) seasons
Major
Major